HMS Fox was a 32-gun Active-class fifth rate frigate of the Royal Navy. She was launched on 2 June 1780 at Bursledon, Hampshire by George Parsons.

Early Career
Fox was sent to the Caribbean in late 1781 and in January the following year under Captain Thomas Windsor captured two Spanish frigates. In March 1783 under Captain George Stoney captured the Spanish frigate Santa Catalina.

Fox was at Plymouth on 20 January 1795 and so shared in the proceeds of the detention of the Dutch naval vessels, East Indiamen, and other merchant vessels that were in port on the outbreak of war between Britain and the Netherlands.

In March 1797, near Visakhapatnam, Fox captured the French privateer Modeste, under Jean-Marie Dutertre.

Took part in the bloodless Raid on Manila in January 1798.

Given that Fox served in the navy's Egyptian campaign between 8 March and 2 September 1801, her officers and crew qualified for the clasp "Egypt" to the Naval General Service Medal that the Admiralty issued in 1847 to all surviving claimants.

Napoleonic Wars
On 12 May 1809, Fox, Commander Henry Hart, brought into Madras, her prize Caravan, Aikin, master. Caravan was the former Cartier, Aikin, master, that the privateer  had captured in October 1807. Caravan had been carrying stones for building forts, arrack, coffee, and several carriages and bandies.

War of 1812
From April to June 1812 Fox was at Woolwich Dockyard being refitted as a 16 gun troopship. Under the rules of prize-money, the troopship Fox shared in the proceeds of the capture of the American vessels in the Battle of Lake Borgne on 14 December 1814.

Fate
Fox was broken up in April 1816.

Notes, citations and references
Notes

Citations

References
 
 Hannings, Bud. (2012). The War of 1812: A Complete Chronology with Biographies of 63 General Officers. Jefferson, North Carolina: McFarland. 
 
 
 

Frigates of the Royal Navy
Ships built on the River Hamble
1780 ships
War of 1812 ships of the United Kingdom